Dmitri Lvovich Proshin (born 23 January 1974) is a former Russian professional football player.

Club career
He played two seasons in the Russian Football National League for FC Torpedo Vladimir.

References

1974 births
People from Mordovia
Living people
Russian footballers
Association football midfielders
FC Torpedo Vladimir players
Sportspeople from Mordovia